Laldingngheta (born 12 February 1989) is an Indian professional footballer who plays as a midfielder for Rangdajied United in the I-League.

Career
Laldingngheta made his professional debut for Rangdajied United F.C. in the I-League against Prayag United, at the Salt Lake Stadium on 22 September 2013. He came on in the 72nd minute for Pratik Chaudhari as Rangdajied United lost 0–2.

Career statistics

References

1989 births
Living people
Indian footballers
Footballers from Mizoram
Rangdajied United F.C. players
Association football midfielders
I-League players